Teen Mom UK is a British reality television series set in the United Kingdom. It is a spin-off of the American franchise Teen Mom. It currently airs on MTV. The series was first announced in September 2016. It currently follows the lives of four British teenage mums who are trying to make it through motherhood. From July 2017, the series is showed in the U.S. under the name Teen Mum.

Cast

Amber Butler 
Amber Butler (from Blackpool, Lancashire)

Amber is the mother of Brooklyn, who she had with her boyfriend Ste Rankine at the age of 17. On 26 April 2019 it was revealed Amber and Ste were expecting another baby together. Born in September they welcomed another baby boy called Hudson. Amber has appeared in all eight series.

Chloe Patton 
Chloe Patton (from Nottingham, Nottinghamshire)

Chloe became a mother, to son Marley, at age 17, with boyfriend Jordan Edwards. Chloe & Jordan admit that they did not plan on starting a family so young. Throughout the seasons of Teen Mom UK, we see Chloe dealing with baby blues, as well as maintaining relationships with friends and family. Chloe has appeared in all eight series.

Megan Salmon Ferrari 
Megan Salmon-Ferrari (from Chelmsford, Essex)

Megan had her son Mckenzie with her first boyfriend, Dylan Siggers, when she was 17 years old. They lived in a caravan on Dylan's Mum and Dad's drive.

In mid-2016, a few weeks after Mckenzie was born, Dylan proposed to Megan, however the engagement was short-lived, with Megan discovering that Dylan had been unfaithful. The couple later reconciled, with Dylan proposing to Megan once again while they were on holiday together in Spain.

Megan announced that she & Dylan were expecting their second child in November 2016, their daughter, Dulcie Mae, was born in March 2017.

Megan took a break from series 4, to focus on herself, children and other projects. Megan returned to Teen Mom UK for series 5 until her second departure choosing not to return for the eighth series.

Megan announced in October 2022 that she is expecting her third baby. She is due to welcome her baby girl with Terence (Tel) Swaby in early 2023.

Dylan Siggers 

In 2019, Dylan welcomed baby boy Carter with previous girlfriend Reeanne Nagle. The couple shocked fans when they revealed in 2020 the birth of daughter Francesca, less than a year after the birth of Carter.  

In January 2023, Dylan revealed his current girlfriend Shannon is pregnant with their first child together, a baby girl. Dylan is now father to 5 children - Mckenzie, Dulcie, Carter, Francesca and the baby girl he has on the way with Shannon.

Mia Boardman 
Mia Boardman (from Southampton, Hampshire)

Mia was 9 months pregnant with Marliya when she started filming Teen Mom UK at the age of 19. The birth of Marliya was captured for the show, with Mia's plans for a natural birth being derailed after the baby's heartbeat dropped, forcing her to have a cesarian section.

Marliya's father is Mia's ex-boyfriend Manley Geddes, they were teenage sweethearts. The couple separated for a few years before filming and during that time Manley had Aalayah with ex Erin, with whom he briefly reunited. The relationship has since ended. Throughout the series of Teen Mom UK, we saw Mia struggle with the relationship between boyfriend Manley & Erin.

Mia left after series 3 to focus more on her new relationship and her career. Mia appeared as a guest in Chloe's segment in series 5. 

On 9 June 2022 it was announced Mia would be returning for the eighth series.

Manley Geddes 

Manley joined Teen Mom UK with Mia in season 1, where they shared baby girl Marliya Geddes with each other. Manley already was father to 9 month old Alayah Geddes, who he shares with on/off girlfriend, Erin Corrigan. 

Manley has previously appeared on channel 4’s “One Born Every Minute” supporting sister Leoni, alongside mum, Maggie Geddes. Both appeared on Teen Mom UK with Manley and Mia. 

Although Mia & Manley split up, Erin stayed close with Manley’s family, particularly Leoni Geddes (Manley’s sister). 

In December 2022, Manley welcomed a baby boy named Kyrie Geddes with an unknown female. There has been some confusion over the baby’s name, all personalised items & the baby mum’s social media, state the baby’s name is “Kyrie”, although Manley insists on calling him Kartel.

Naomi Konickova 
Naomi Konickova (from London)
 
Naomi had daughter Kyanna at the age of 17, with boyfriend Raphael Poitou. The show followed Naomi whilst training to be a makeup artist and she says that becoming a mum has made her aspire to achieve she left her dream even more, as well as covering the rocky relationship between Naomi & Kyanna's father. 

Naomi only appeared in the first series, no reason was said as to why of her departure.

Sassi Simmonds 
Sassi Simmonds (from Stockport)
 
Sassi has daughter Zena'ya Saint. She has been with boyfriend Darren since school and are childhood sweethearts. Sassi joined the cast of Teen Mom UK at the start of season 2, after the departure of Naomi Konickova. Sassi has taken a break from the show and will not return for series 7.

On 9 June 2022 it was announced Sassi would be returning for the eighth series.

Sassi underwent breast augmentation surgery in 2020 and had veneers done in Turkey in 2021, which is documented in her Instagram Highlights.

Darren Quirk 

Darren joined Sassi in season 2 with daughter Zena’ya Saint. 

Darren works as a roofer in Manchester, his company called Slates & Ladders. 

Although Sassi and Darren have been single a while, they continue to co-parent incredibly well for their daughter, even going on family holidays abroad together.

Shannon Wise 
Shannon Wise (from High Wycombe, Buckinghamshire)

Shannon has son Theodore with ex boyfriend Charlie. She joined the cast of Teen Mom UK at the start of season 4, after the departure of Mia Boardman. During series 5 it was revealed that Shannon was pregnant with her and Charlie's second child, due July 2019. On 30 July, they welcomed their second son, Frankie.
Charlie and Shannon are not together anymore. Shannon did not return following the series finale of series 6.

Shannon had her third baby, a baby girl named Ariyah, in January 2022. Ariyah’s father is Shannon’s partner, Arron Clarke. The pair are still together, while Shannon co-parents with ex Charlie.

Charlie Raimbach 

Charles “Charlie” Raimbach joined the cast of Teen Mom UK alongside then partner Shannon Wise in season 4. They had son Theodore together in January 2017, and then went on to welcome son, Frankie, in July 2019.

Emma Finch 
Emma Finch (from Birmingham)

Emma joined the cast of Teen Mom UK at the start of series 7. She has a son, Jeremiah, he is 7 months old. Emma tries to co-parent with his Father and her ex partner Nasseh. A big storyline for Emma was the fact Nasseh did not introduce Emma or Jeremiah to his family until he was a couple of months old. Emma only appeared in one series.

Nasseh 

Nasseh is the father of Emma’s son Jeremiah. He is an artist from liverpool.

Timeline of cast members

Episodes

Series overview

Series 1 (2016)

Series 2 (2017)

Series 3 (2018)

Series 4 (2018)

Series 5 (2019)

Series 6 (2019)

Series 7 (2020)

Series 8 (2022)

References 

2016 British television series debuts
2010s British reality television series
2020s British reality television series
British television series based on American television series
English-language television shows
MTV reality television series
Teenage pregnancy in television
Television series about teenagers